Hine is a 1971 British drama television series set in the Middle East which was created by Wilfred Greatorex. The series stars Barrie Ingham as international arms dealer Joe Hine. Paul Eddington portrays Astor Harris, an arms manufacturer with close ties to the British government, and John Steiner plays Hine's personal assistant Jeremy Windsor. Other cast members include Sarah Craze as Hine's secretary Susannah Grey, Colin Gordon as	Walpole Gibb, and John Moreno as Frank the Chauffeur. The series premiered on April 7, 1971 on Associated Television.  It ran for a total of 13 episodes in a single season, and all are now available on DVD.

References

External links

1971 British television series debuts
1971 British television series endings
1970s British drama television series
1970s British television miniseries
ITV television dramas
Television series by ITV Studios
Television shows produced by Associated Television (ATV)
English-language television shows
Television shows set in England
Television series set in the Middle East